Häussler or Haussler is a German surname. Notable people with the surname include:

David Haussler (born 1953), American bioinformatician
Ernst Häussler (1914–1979), German SS officer
Heinrich Haussler (born 1984), Australian cyclist
Iris Häussler (born 1962), Canadian artist
Richard Häussler (1908–1964), German actor and film director

See also 
 Häusler

German-language surnames